The Boys' Brigade in Malaysia or Briged Putera Malaysia is part of the global Boys' Brigade movement.

The motto of Boys' Brigade in Malaysia is  the same as Boys' Brigade, which is "Sure and Stedfast" that retained the old spelling of "Steadfast". In Malaysia, the movement is recognised by the Ministry of Youth and Sports and the Ministry of Education as an approved Extra Curricular Activity (ECA). It is also an affiliate of the Malaysian Youth Council (Majlis Belia Malaysia), an associate member of the Council of Churches of Malaysia (CCM), and an associate member of the National Evangelical Christian Fellowship (NECF).

History 
1946
The Boys' Brigade in Malaya started in the state of Penang with the founding of the 1st Penang Company by Mr. Robert Davis with Mr. Geh Hun Kheng, an educationalist, as the Company Captain. The company was under the sponsorship of Madras Lane Chinese (English Speaking Section) Methodist Church.

1954
From Penang, the BB began to spread to other parts of Malaya beginning with the 1st Kuala Lumpur Company, which was formed under the sponsorship of Wesley Methodist Church, Kuala Lumpur. The movement then began spreading rapidly to other towns and small rural areas of Malaya to meet the needs of the Members.

1961
The movement spread its wings to East Malaysia with the formation of the 1st Kuching Company in Sarawak by Mr Charles Henry Ingka under the sponsorship of St Thomas' Anglican Church.

1966
The first National Review and Display was held in Kuala Lumpur. The event has subsequently been held 20 more times (as of 2013) and has been renamed the National Pesta and Convention.

National Pesta and Convention 

The National Pesta and Convention (also commonly known as 'Pesta' ) began as the National Review and Display in 1966 is said to be one of the biggest events which is unique to the Boys' Brigade in Malaysia. Today, participation is open to all current members of the Boys' Brigade in Malaysia, as well as members of overseas Boys' Brigade companies.

Whilst games and other activities vary across each Pesta, it has been customary since 1966 for a national band competition to be held at every Pesta except during 1988, 1992 and 2001. A footdrill competition and a group singing competition was added to the tradition in later years. During the Pesta in Malacca, more element were considered for the Pesta overall title, which includes a State Council march past, size of contingent, banner design and other much more complicated processes in determining the overall champion. However, this system was not used in the following pesta, held in 2006 in Kuala Lumpur. The Kuala Lumpur Pesta 2006 more or less reverted to the traditional system of determining the overall champions, with an inclusion of one more event, which is the state sports. The Kuala Lumpur Pesta was won by 2 home companies, the 1st Kuala Lumpur and 3rd Kuala Lumpur. The State Sports competition was won by Penang State Council.

National Pesta 2020 Melaka (Dare 2 Be Different) which was to be held from 1–5 June 2020 is cancelled due to the COVID-19 pandemic, instead is launched virtually, the first virtual Pesta ever.

Pesta Hosts

Sections 
There are four sections for different age groups, which may vary from company to company. The general structure of each section is as below:

 Pre-Junior Section: 6 to 8 years old (Kindergarten to Primary 2)
 Junior Section: 9 to 11 years old (Primary 3 to Primary 6)
 Senior Section: 12 to 19 years old (Secondary 1 to Secondary 5)
 Primer Section: 19 to 21 years (Post-Secondary)

Ranks

Members
The ranks in the Senior Section from Lance Corporal to Sergeant is categorized as Non-Commissioned Officers (NCO).
 Private (Pte.)
 Lance Corporal (L/Cpl.) (at least 14 years old)
 Corporal (Cpl.) (at least 15 years old)
 Sergeant (Sgt.) (at least 16 years old)
 Staff Sergeant (S/Sgt.)

Members that want to be an NCO are required to join the Basic NCO Training School (BNTS) and Advanced NCO Training School (ANTS).

Officers
This ranks attainable by Officers include:
 Warrant Officer (W/O.)
 Lieutenant (Lt.)
 Hononary Captain (H/Capt.)
 Captain (Capt.)
 Chaplain (Chap.)

Badges and awards 
Participation and achievements in Brigade activities are recognised by individual companies by the presentation of badges to company members in official ceremonies. Brigade members wear their earned badges on their uniform sleeves, on both upper arms. The highest award attainable in the Boys' Brigade in Malaysia is the Founder's Badge (see below).

Pre-Junior and Junior Section 
This list is ordered from lowest level to highest level.

Senior Section 
The badges in Senior Section can be divided into 3 categories: Service awards, Special awards and Proficiency Achievement awards; and five groups: mandatory/compulsory, Interest (Group A), Adventure (Group B), Community (Group C) and Physical (Group D). This list is ordered alphabetically, then from lowest level to highest level.

Members with advanced level for any Proficiency Achievement awards receives a red cloth to be put under the badge with advanced level to indicate that the badge is in advanced level.

Founders's Badge 
The Founder's Award (also known as Founder's Badge) is the highest award attainable in the Senior Section of the Boys' Brigade in Malaysia. Those who attained this award are called a Founder's Man. In countries where Queen Elizabeth II is head of state, the equivalent award is the Queen's Badge, and accordingly the members attaining the award are known as Queen's Man.  First introduced in 1962, the Founder's Award remains an extremely exclusive award for Malaysian Boys' Brigade members, with less than 250 members in the whole country achieving the Award from its inception until today. The title of Founder's Man is held for life, but the badge itself may only be worn while serving as a NCO, Staff-Sergeant, or Primer.

The badge is cast from unpolished copper, giving it a bronze appearance, and is relatively heavy compared to other badges. The border of the Badge bears the words "Founder's Badge , The Boys' Brigade" and the BB Emblem on top. In the centre of the badge, there is the image of the Boys' Brigade Founder, Sir William Alexander Smith.

Requirements include earning at least the rank of Lance Corporal, 5 years of service in the Senior Section and/or Primer Section of the Boys' Brigade, attained the President's Award, and nomination from the Officer's Council (These are the requirements for the award in Malaysia - the requirements vary from country to country, most notably in Singapore where the most prestigious BB award is the President's Award rather than the Founder's Badge, although the Founder's Badge is one of their awards). The winners of the Founder's Award represent the ideal Brigade Boy, who has embraced the BB Method of Discipline and Religion as twin pillars, as well as exhibited a wholesome development in the four aspects of the BB, which are Social, Spiritual, Educational and Physical.

List of BB Companies in Malaysia 
As of 2019, there are 127 BB companies in Malaysia. Each BB company in Malaysia is identified by a unique number and the geographical location, namely the town or city, or district or state where the sponsoring authority exist, to represent that company. In general, the smaller the number is, the earlier the company was founded. There are, however, instances of newer companies inheriting the nomenclature of previous companies, especially if the sponsoring authority of the new company was also the same for the defunct company. One example would be the 1st Petaling Jaya Company; established in 1983; which inherited the nomenclature of an older company; which existed from 1959 - 1979; by the same designation.

State Councils
The BB companies in Malaysia are organised into regional groupings known as State Councils. Each company is categorised into the appropriate State Councils based on its geographical location. A State Commissioner is elected bi-ennially to head each State Council.

The BB companies are listed in the tables below by State Councils and year of establishment. Please note that some BB companies have been reorganised and reactivated after a period of being inactive or defunct. The original year of establishment for these companies are listed with their reactivation date in parentheses.

The list of BB companies in Malaysia, both current and inactive are:

Johor State Council

Kuala Lumpur State Council (Companies in Negeri Sembilan and Pahang within jurisdiction)

Melaka State Council

Penang State Council (Companies in Kedah and Kelantan within jurisdiction)

Perak State Council

Sabah State Council

Sarawak State Council

Selangor State Council

See also 
 Boys' Brigade
 Girls' Brigade

References

Sources 
 
 (2003) Berita Anchor, October 2003. Malaysia: The Boys' Brigade in Malaysia.

External links 
 
 The BB Directory - International Boys' Brigade Directory
 The 5th Sandakan Company
 The 4th Petaling Jaya Company Boys' Brigade in Malaysia

Christian youth organizations
Youth organisations based in Malaysia
Boys' Brigade
Christian organizations established in 1946